Chinenye Fidelis (born 28 October 1993) is a Nigerian weightlifter. She represents Nigeria both nationally and internationally. She has competed in the Nigerian National Sports Festival, African Weightlifting Championships and World Weightlifting Championships.

Achievements 
Fidelis in 2008 represented Nigeria at the 19th MEN and 8th women African championships where she was ranked 1st in the 48kg event. In 2011, she competed in the World  weightlifting Championship where she ranked 13th in the 53kg event. 

She competed at the 2012 African Weightlifting Championships where she set a new African record and won a gold medal  in the + 53 kg event. 

At the 17th National Sports Festival in Port Harcourt, Nigeria, she broke the national record in the 53kg snatch event. Fidelis lifted a total of 85kg to beat the old record of 82.5kg set by Patience Lawal in the 2006 edition of the Games. Fidelis also set a new record for Africa in the clean and Jerk event. She lifted a weight of 120 kg beating the old record of 112kg also by Patience Lawal.

She represented Nigeria at the 2016 African Weightlifting Championships held in Yaoundé ranking first in clean and jerk and snatch events.  During the African Championships – Continental Olympic Qualification Event in Nairobi, Kenya, Fidelis broke four continental records on the first day by lifting 87kgs, and ended with a total of 202kgs being both junior and senior african records.

References

External link 
Chinenye Fidelis awarded scholarship by National Sports Commission (NSC).

Living people
1993 births
Nigerian female weightlifters
African Weightlifting Championships medalists
21st-century Nigerian women